The Intruders is a 1994 novel by Stephen Coonts.

Plot
After two combat cruises, Grafton is now a flight instructor on a naval base. During a visit to his girlfriend Callie, he has an argument with her father, who's anti-war. Distraught, Grafton is later involved in a bar brawl with another man who's anti-war. His shore duty is cut short and he is sent on another cruise to help train a USMC A-6 squadron. 

Grafton witnesses accident by accident, some with fatal results. A faulty arresting cable, an in-flight fire, landing at night in bad weather, a cold shot, and lightning strike his aircraft. Grafton is thinking about quitting the Navy but eventually makes up his mind to stay.

The book ends when Grafton is shot down by a weapon smuggler and is captured. He and his BN survive, albeit injured and escape from their captor.

Characters
Lt. Jake “Cool Hand” Grafton – Naval aviator, protagonist.
Capt. Clarence Odysseus “Flap” Le Beau – Grafton's Bombardier/Navigator, an ex-Marine Recon Officer.
“Real McCoy” – Navy Landing signal officer, also A-6 pilot.
Callie McKenzie – Grafton’s girlfriend. Repeated character.

Aircraft appearing/mentioned
The Grumman A-6 Intruder.  A two-man, twin-engine bomber flown from aircraft carriers.
The McDonnell Douglas F-4 Phantom II. A two-man, twin-engine fighter bomber flown from aircraft carriers.
The LTV A-7 Corsair II one-man, carrier-borne, light bomber.
The North American A-5 Vigilante. A two-man, twin-engine, carrier-borne, reconnaissance aircraft.   

American thriller novels
Techno-thriller novels
Novels by Stephen Coonts
Aviation novels